Bright Castle is a castle near Downpatrick, County Down, Northern Ireland.  The tower house is a Scheduled Historic Monument sited in the townland of Bright, in Down District Council area, on Coniamstown Rd, at grid ref: J5066 3822.

References

See also 
Castles in Northern Ireland

Castles in County Down
Ruined castles in Northern Ireland
Scheduled monuments in Northern Ireland